Chorisandrachne is a genus of plants in the family Phyllanthaceae first described as a genus in 1969. It contains only one known species, Chorisandrachne diplosperma, native to southern Thailand.

References

Phyllanthaceae
Phyllanthaceae genera
Monotypic Malpighiales genera
Endemic flora of Thailand